I'm with the Band: Confessions of a Groupie is a 1987 memoir by former groupie Pamela Des Barres. It was a New York Times best seller.

Overview
The book tells the story of Pamela Ann Miller, a groupie who gets a kind of fame in the 1960s by having wild nights with musicians and actors. Pictures of famous musicians and actors accompany the many stories of her time in Los Angeles, California during the late 1960s and early 1970s. She recounts tales of moments shared with girlfriends The GTOs which they use as a way to outwardly express themselves. She becomes Frank Zappa's nanny as well as has relationships with Jimmy Page and with Don Johnson. 

Her escapades include travels to England where she spends time with Mick Jagger and others. She also travels to Europe before coming back home. She later falls in love with Michael Des Barres, an English glam rocker. She ends the books with the story of their wedding and the birth of her son Nicholas Dean Des Barres.

Publication history 
After its publication in 1987, I'm with the Band was out of print until its republication in 2003. A 30th anniversary edition was released in May, 2018.

In 1995, Des Barres released a CD, I'm with the Band, on which she reads excerpts from the book.

Reception
I'm with the Band was described by Kirkus Reviews as "a classic account of rampant narcissism among guitar egomaniacs." The New York Times described I'm with the Band as "the brightest, sexiest, funniest of... the current outpouring of groupie literature." In The Wall Street Journal, Andrew Ferguson called the memoir a "vulgar kiss-and-tell". A Newsday reviewer said the memoir "is a deft mix of cultural history and gossip". In LA Weekly, Helen Knode observes that the book is "pretty overwrought, both in its emotionalism...and in its expression". Nearly twenty years after the book's initial publication, a reviewer in the Birmingham Post called it "the stuff of legend".

Adaptation attempts  
In 1988, Ally Sheedy optioned the rights to I'm with the Band, intending to play the role of Des Barres. In 1995, producer Beverly Camhe proposed to make a movie of I'm with the Band, starring Drew Barrymore, and directed by Tamra Davis.

In 2002, Des Barres and Allison Anders co-wrote a screenplay, based on the memoir, for Starz cable channel.

References

Groupies
1987 non-fiction books
American memoirs
Music autobiographies